Akai is a Hong Kong manufacturer of consumer electronics. It was founded as Akai Electric Company Ltd in Tokyo, Japan, in 1946. Grande Holdings in Hong Kong purchased the Akai brand, and now distributes various electronic products such as LED TV, washing machines, clothes dryers, air conditioners and smart phones, through collaborations with other electronics companies bearing relevant expertise. inMusic Brands in the United States took over Akai's brand, starting the ‘Akai Professional’ label, that distributes high-end audio electronics products.

Corporate history

The company's business eventually became discombobulated and it left the audio industry in 1991. At its peak in the late 1990s, Akai Holdings employed 100,000 workers and had annual sales of HK$40 billion (US$5.2 billion). The company filed for insolvency in November 2000, owing creditors US$1.1B. It emerged that ownership of Akai Holdings had somehow passed in 1999 to Grande Holdings, a company founded by Akai's chairman James Ting. The liquidators claimed that Ting had stolen over US$800m from the company with the assistance of accountants Ernst & Young who had tampered with audit documents going back to 1994. Ting was imprisoned for false accounting in 2005, and E&Y paid $200m to settle the negligence case out of court in September 2009. In a separate lawsuit, a former E&Y partner, Christopher Ho, made a "substantial payment" to Akai creditors in his role as chairman of Grande Holdings.

History

Historical products

Akai's products included reel-to-reel audiotape recorders (such as the GX series), tuners (top level AT, mid level TR and TT series), audio cassette decks (top level GX and TFL, mid level TC, HX and CS series), amplifiers (AM and TA series), microphones, receivers, turntables, video recorders and loudspeakers.

Many Akai products were sold under the name Roberts in the US, as well as A&D in Japan (from 1987 after a partnership with Mitsubishi Electric), Tensai and Transonic Strato in Western Europe. During the late 1960s, Akai adopted Tandberg's cross-field recording technologies (using an extra tape head) to enhance high frequency recording and switched to the increasingly reliable Glass and crystal (X'tal) (GX) ferrite heads a few years later. The company's most popular products were the GX-630D, GX-635D, GX-747/GX-747DBX and GX-77 open-reel recorders (latter featuring an auto-loading function), the three-head, closed-loop GX-F95, GX-90, GX-F91, GX-R99 cassette decks, and the AM-U61, AM-U7 and AM-93 stereo amplifiers.

Akai manufactured and badged most of its imported hi-fi products with the Tensai brand (named after the Swiss audio and electronics distributor Tensai International). Tensai International was Akai's exclusive distributor for the Swiss and Western European markets until 1988.

Akai limited its consumer hi-fi product line in the United States and Europe towards the end of the 20th century.

Introduction of the on-screen display
Akai produced consumer video cassette recorders (VCR) during the 1980s. The Akai VS-2 was the first VCR with an on-screen display, originally named the Interactive Monitor System. By displaying the information directly on the television screen, this innovation eliminated the need for the user to be physically near the VCR to program recording, read the tape counter, or perform other common features. Within a few years, all competing manufacturers had adopted on-screen display technology in their own products.

Akai Professional

In 1984, a new division of the company was formed to focus on the manufacture and sale of electronic instruments, and was called Akai Professional.

The first product released by the new subsidiary was the MG1212, a 12 channel, 12 track recorder. This innovative device used a special VHS-like cartridge (a MK-20), and was good for 10 minutes of continuous 12 track recording (19 cm per second) or 20 minutes at half speed (9.5 cm per second). One track (14) was permanently dedicated to recording absolute time, and another one for synchronization such as SMPTE or MTC. Each channel strip included dbx type-1 noise reduction and semi-parametric equalizers (with fixed bandwidths). The unit also had innovations like an electronic 2 bus system, a 12 stereo channel patch bay and auto punch in and out, among others. The unique transport design and noise reduction gave these units a recording quality rivaling that of more expensive 16 track machines using 1" tape. The MG-1212 was later replaced by the MG-1214, which improved the transport mechanism and overall performance.

AX series analog synthesizers

Other early products included the Akai AX80 8-voice analog synthesizer in 1984, followed by AX60 and AX73 6-voice analog synthesizers ca.1986. The AX-60 borrowed many ideas from the Roland Juno series, but used voltage controlled analog oscillators (VCO) as a sound source as opposed to Roland's more common digitally controlled analog oscillators (DCO), and also allowed the performer to "split" the keyboard (using different timbres for different ranges of keys). The AX-60 also had the ability to interface with Akai's early samplers through a serial cable, using 12-bit samples as an additional oscillator.

Digital Samplers (S, X, Z series)

The S612 12-bit digital sampler in 1985, was the first in a series of (relatively) affordable samplers already in 19-inch studio-rack format but in black color. It held only a single sample at a time, which was loaded into memory via a separate disk drive utilizing Quick Disk 2.8-inch floppy disks. The maximum sample time at the highest quality sampling rate (32 kHz) was one second.

The introduction of a "professional" range of digital samplers began with the 12-bit S900 in 1986, followed by the X7000 keyboard sampler in 1986, and the S700 rack-mount version in 1987. Unlike the single-sample S612, however, they allowed the use of six active samples at once, had a built-in disk drive and could be extended with six individual outputs via cable and a flash memory extension which added another six samples to the memory for multisample playback. The S700/X7000 sampler series were light-grey colored, which didn't change throughout the whole "professional" range of Akai samplers.

The 16-bit Akai S1000 series followed in 1988, adding the option to read CD-ROMs and write to hard disks via SCSI. This range was superseded by the S3000 series in 1993, with optional built-in CD-ROM drive, followed by the S5000 and S6000.  Additional releases of note were the Z4 and Z8 24-bit 96 kHz samplers.

Sampler Models
S612 - 1985
X7000 - Keyboard Sampler - 1986
S700 - 1987
S900 - 1986
X3700 - Keyboard Sampler - 1986
S950 - 1988
S1000 - 1988
S1000KB - Keyboard Sampler - 1988
S1000PB - Playback only device - 1988
S1100 - 1992
S01 - 1993
S2000 - 1995
S2800 - 1992
S20 - Drum Machine-styled device - 1997
S3000 - 1993
S3000XL
S3200 - 1996
S3200XL - 1996
S5000 - 1998
S6000 - 1999
Z4 - 2002
Z8 - 2002

MPC

Akai also produced several Digital MIDI sequencers and digital synthesizers such as the MPC range, a line of integrated drum machines, MIDI sequencers, samplers and direct-to-disk recorders.

New ownership of Akai Professional
In December 1999, one year before the application of Civil Rehabilitation Act to Akai Electric Company Ltd., the brand of its musical instrument division, Akai Professional was acquired by a company of the United States. The new company was dubbed "Akai Professional Musical Instrument Corporation". (AKAI professional M.I.) was established in the same year, however it was bankrupted in 2005.

In 2004, following a US distribution deal, the Akai Professional Musical Instrument division was acquired by Jack O'Donnell, owner of Numark Industries and Alesis. In 2012, inMusic Brands was formed as a parent company for O'Donnell's companies, including Akai Professional.

Current products
In early 2003, Grande Holdings began undergoing a re-exposure of Akai's brands by marketing various audio visual products manufactured by Samsung. In the same year, Grande began to distribute Akai home appliances such as air conditioners, vacuum cleaners, and refrigerators. In 2010s, it began to distribute Akai smart phones collaborated with some Chinese smart phone manufacturers (Gionee, etc.), in India and some other countries.

Video 
 AV receivers
 Portable DVD players
 DVD players
 DVD recorders
 Home theatre systems
 Home theatre Speakers
 VCD players
 VCRs

Mobile sound 
 Amplifiers
 Cassette receivers
 CD changers
 CD receivers
 DVD changers
 DVD receivers
 Car Audio – DVD players
 Car Audio – Speakers
 Car Audio – TFT monitors

Home appliances 
 Air conditioners
 Air coolers
 Air purifiers
 Chest freezers
 Dishwashers
 Heaters
 Ice makers
 Microwave ovens
 Refrigerators
 Showcases
 Vacuum cleaners
 Washing machines
 Water dispensers
 Wine cellars

Audio 
 Stereo rack systems
 Mini systems
 Micro music 
 Retro radios
 Sound boxes
 Portable music players
 Tape Decks
 Portable DAT Recorder/Player (Blue colored body,Webshop DirectOrder only, OEM from JVC/Victor)
 Portable MD Recorder/Player (Blue color Body,Webshop DirectOrder only, OEM from JVC/Victor)

Digital 
 Wireless Surround Sound Systems
 Bluetooth
 MP3 player
 Mobile phones
 Smart phones

Television 
 Color televisions
 LCD televisions
 Plasma television
 Set-top boxes

Akai Professional products

Akai Professional is not affiliated with Akai (a consumer audio and television brand). Akai Professional changed ownership in 2004 and is an inMusic Brands company, based in Rhode Island, United States.

Synthesizers
 AX60 (c.1986) – discontinued
 AX73 (c.1986) – discontinued
 AX80 (1984) – discontinued
 VX90 (c.1986) – rack-mount version of AX73, discontinued
 VX600 (c.1988) – 3-octave keyboard synthesizer with EWI connection jack, discontinued
 Akai SG01v (c.1996) – desktop sound module, discontinued
 MINIAK – discontinued
 S612 (1985) – discontinued
 S900 (1986) – discontinued
 X3700 (c.1986) – discontinued
 X7000 (c.1986) – discontinued
 S700 (1987) – discontinued
 S950 – discontinued
 S1000 (1988) – discontinued
 S1100 (1990) – discontinued
 S01 (1992) – discontinued
 S2800 (1992) – discontinued
 S3000 (1992) – discontinued
 S3200 (1992) – discontinued
 CD3000 (1993) – discontinued
 REMIX16 (1995) – table-top phrase sampler, discontinued
 S2000 (1995) – discontinued
 S3000XL (1995) – discontinued
 S3200XL – discontinued
 S20 (c.1997) – discontinued
 CD3000XL (c.1997) – discontinued
 S5000 (c.1999) – discontinued
 S6000 (c.1999) – discontinued
 Z4 (2002) – discontinued
 Z8 (2002) – discontinued
 MPX8
 MPX16
 MPC Key 61

Music Production Center

 MPC60 (1987) – MIDI Production Centre, discontinued
 MPC60II – (1991) – discontinued
 MPC3000 (1993) – discontinued
 MPC3000LE (1999) – discontinued
 MPC2000 (1997) – discontinued
 MPC2000XL (2000) – discontinued
 MPC4000 (2002) – discontinued
 MPC1000 (2003) – discontinued
 MPC500 (2006) – discontinued
 MPC2500 (2005) – discontinued
 MPC5000 (2008) – discontinued
 MPC Renaissance (2012) – discontinued
 MPC Studio (2012) – Discontinued
 MPC Element (2013) – Discontinued
 MPC Touch (2015)
 MPC Studio Black (2016)
 MPC Live (2017)
 MPC X (2017)
MPC Force (2019)
MPC One (2020)
MPC Live ll (2020)
MPC Studio II (2021)
MPC Key 61 (2022)

Computer audio interfaces

 EIE (2011)
 EIE PRO (2011)

Drum machines
 MR16 (c.1985)
 XE-8 1U rack mounted, Acoustic drum sound from S-1000 library, discontinued
 XR10, discontinued Table Top Playback Sampler incl XE-8 Sound with Dance Sample Sounds 16-bit, discontinued
 XR20 (2008) Made by Alesis
 Rhythm Wolf (c.2015) Tabletop analogue drum machine with bass synth
 Tom Cat

Electronic wind instruments
 EVI1000 (1987) – Electronic Valve Instruments, discontinued
 EWI1000 (1987) – Electronic Wind Instrument, discontinued
 EWV2000 – Electronic Wind Instrument sound module, discontinued
 EWI4000S (2005)
 EWI-USB (2008)
 EWI5000 (2014)
 EWI SOLO (2020)

Effects units / Utilities
 EX90R – Reverb, discontinued
 ME10D – MIDI digital delay, discontinued
 ME15F – MIDI dynamic controller, discontinued
 ME20A – MIDI sequencer arpeggiator, discontinued
 ME25S – MIDI note separator, discontinued
 ME30P – MIDI 4×8 patchbay, discontinued
 ME35T – Audio/MIDI trigger, discontinued
 ME80P – MIDI 8×10 patchbay, discontinued
 MB76 – Programmable mix bay, discontinued
 PEQ6 – Programmable equaliser, discontinued
 DP88 (1993) – digital audio patchbay, discontinued
 AR900 (1986–89) – 16-bit MIDI Digital Reverb, discontinued
 MFC42 (2001) – filter bank, discontinued
 HV10 Harmony generator (2002)
 VST Plug-ins (2002)

Guitar pedals
 Analog Delay
 Blues Overdrive
 Chorus
 Compressor
 Deluxe Distortion
 Drive3 Distortion
 Drive3 Fuzz
 Drive3 Overdrive
 E2 Head Rush
 Flanger
 Phase Shifter

iPod/iPad Keyboard Controllers
 SynthStation25
 SynthStation49
 AkaiMPC Fly (2012)

MIDI Sequencers
 MS08 (c.1985) – discontinued
 ASQ10 (c.1986/7) – discontinued

Standalone Multi-track Audio Recorders
 MG614 (c.1983?) – discontinued
 MG1212 (1984) – discontinued
 MG1214 (c.1985) – discontinued
 DR1200/DL1200 (1988) – discontinued
 DD1000 (1990) – discontinued
 DD/DL1500 (1994) – 16-track DAW, discontinued
 DD8 (1996) – discontinued
 DD8plus (1998) – discontinued
 DR4D (1993) – discontinued
 DR8 (1994) – discontinued
 DR16 (1995) – discontinued
 DPS12 (1997) – discontinued
 DPS16 (1999) – discontinued
 DPS24 (2002) – discontinued
 DPS24MKII – discontinued
 RE32 (1999) – controller for DD/DR series, discontinued

Studio Monitor Speakers

 RPM3
 RPM8 – discontinued
 50x

USB MIDI / MIDI controllers
 APC20
 APC40
 APC40 MkII
 EWI-USB
 LPD8 (2009)
 LPK25 (2009)
 MPD16 (2002) – discontinued
 MPD18 – discontinued
 MPD24 (2006) – discontinued
 MPD26 (2010)
 MPD32 (2008)
 MPK25 (2009)
 MPK49 (2007)
 MPK49 V2 (2007)
 MPK61 (2009)
 MPK88 (2009)
 MPK Mini
 MPK Mini Play (comes packed with 128 sounds and its own built-in speaker)
 MPK Mini MK II (2014)
 MPK Mini MK III (2020)
 MPK225 (2014)
 MPK249 (2014)
 MPK261 (2014)
 MAX25 (2014)
 MAX49 (2014)
 MX73 MIDI Master Keyboard – discontinued
 MX76 MIDI Master Keyboard (1987) – discontinued

See also

 1/4-inch Akai VTRs
 Akai VK (videocassette format) VTRs
 List of phonograph manufacturers

Notes

References

Further reading

External links

 Akai
 Akai Professional
 Vintage Cassette Decks Collection of Akai Vintage Cassette decks and other brands.
 akai.com at archive.org an archive of akai.com from 1996 to 1998.

Audio equipment manufacturers of Japan
Manufacturing companies established in 1929
Consumer electronics brands
Home appliance manufacturers of Japan
In-car entertainment
Mobile phone manufacturers
Musical instrument manufacturing companies of Japan
Synthesizer manufacturing companies of Japan
Guitar effects manufacturing companies
Film and video technology
Phonograph manufacturers
Japanese companies established in 1929
Companies formerly listed on the Tokyo Stock Exchange
Companies that have filed for bankruptcy in Japan
Japanese brands